Damian Wayne, also known as Damian al Ghul (Arabic: دميان الغول), is a superhero appearing in American comic books published by DC Comics, created by Grant Morrison and Andy Kubert, commonly in association with Batman. He is the son of Batman and Talia al Ghul, and thus the grandson of Batman villain Ra's al Ghul and the potential inheritor of Wayne Enterprises. With the al Ghuls citing Bruce Wayne as the optimal successor to their empire, after faking a miscarriage to his father and calling off their marriage, Talia has kept his existence hidden from Batman until Batman #656 (2006). In turn, the character is revealed to have originally been intended to "kill and replace his famous father," as well as serving as a host body for Ra's al Ghul, thus, in theory, unifying the Wayne and Demon factions as intended by the al Ghuls. A prototype of the character originally appeared as an unnamed infant in the 1987 story Batman: Son of the Demon, which at the time was not considered canon. Following this, various alternate universe stories dealt with the character's life, giving him various names. In 2006, the character was reinterpreted as Damian Wayne by Grant Morrison, and introduced into the main continuity in Batman #655, the first issue of the "Batman and Son" story arc. Damian Wayne is the fifth character to assume the role of Robin, Batman's vigilante partner.

Damian, as a preadolescent, was left by his mother in the care of his father, who had been unaware of his existence. He is violent, self-important, and was trained by the League of Assassins, learning to kill at a young age, which troubles the relationship with his father who refuses to kill. However, the Dark Knight does care for his lost progeny. After the events of Batman R.I.P. and Batman: Battle for the Cowl, he takes the role of Robin at ten years of age, becoming the fifth person to use the Robin persona. He first worked with Dick Grayson before going to work alongside his father, upon the original's return to the role of Batman.

Damian Wayne will make his live-action debut in the film The Brave and the Bold, produced by DC Studios.

Publication history
The child from Son of the Demon was used as a backup character in various stories before appearing as Damian Wayne.

In the Elseworlds story, The Brotherhood of the Bat (1995), a version named Tallant Wayne appears, who crusades against his grandfather Ra's al Ghul. Brotherhood of the Bat features a future in which Ra's al Ghul discovers the Batcave following Bruce Wayne's death, and outfits the League of Assassins in variant Batman costumes based on Wayne's rejected designs. Talia and Bruce's son joins the Brotherhood in his father's costume, to destroy it from within.

In another Elseworlds story, Kingdom Come (1996) by Mark Waid and Alex Ross, which functioned as a possible future to the canon of the time, this child of Batman and Talia is named Ibn al Xu'ffasch (Arabic: ابن الخفّاش), literally "Son of the Bat", and is a member of Lex Luthor's inner circle. He works as a double agent for Batman in Luthor's organization, and thus aligned with his father instead of his maternal grandfather. In the Elliot S! Maggin novelization of Kingdom Come, al Xu'ffasch tells Bruce that his mother Talia is still alive and working as a Mother Superior in Cairo, one of Mother Teresa's successors. al Xu'ffasch reappears in Waid's 1999 sequel The Kingdom.

The Kingdom: Son of the Bat shows flashbacks that shed new insights into Ibn al Xu'ffasch's history: that he was reared by Ra's al Ghul to be the heir to his empire, that he eventually murdered his grandfather (cutting off his head to prevent yet another regeneration), and that he sought therapy from psychiatrist Dr. Gibson. He was eventually recruited by Rip Hunter to try to stop a madman named Gog from altering his history. He works with several other heroes of his generation – Kid Flash, the daughter of the Flash (Wally West); Nightstar and Offspring, the son of Plastic Man.

In League of Batmen (2001), the sequel to Brotherhood of the Bat, Tallant leads his own team of variant Batmen to combat the plague that was al Ghul's legacy. During the battle, Tallant discovers that his grandfather is the one who murdered his father and then cloned him. Ra's even sent the clone to murder his own daughter. Because of the deaths of his parents at Ra's's hands, Tallant has completed following his father's tragic path as Batman. The new Dark Knight desires justice for his parents along with trying to stop his grandfather while having to battle his father's murderous double.

Grant Morrison's story titled Batman and Son (2006) expands upon the Son of the Demon storyline as part of a remodeling of Batman's personality after the events of Infinite Crisis. In Morrison's version, the child Damian Wayne is the result of a tryst between Batman and Talia, during which the Dark Knight claims he was drugged when they were at the Tropic of Cancer, though Morrison later admitted the claim of drugging was a canonical error on their part. Since then however in issues of the Morrison penned Batman Incorporated, the drugging is reaffirmed and is once again part of Damian's origin. However, Batman and Talia's tryst was later shown as consensual in Peter J. Tomasi's Batman and Robin, thus the circumstances of Damian's conception can vary depending on the writers.

The final issue of 52 (2008) designates the Kingdom Come alternate universe as Earth-22, thus making the Ibn al Xu'ffasch version of Bruce and Talia's son part of the DC Multiverse. Justice Society of America vol. 3 #22 (2009) reveals that he would eventually marry Nightstar with whom he would have a daughter and son, and his family has inherited the Wayne Estates after Batman's death.

Fictional character biography

Batman and Son

Damian's origin was unknown to Batman. Damian was genetically perfected and grown in an artificial womb to be the perfect warrior. He is raised by his mother Talia al Ghul and the League of Assassins. He becomes a talented martial artist before his teenage years, at which time Talia reveals Damian's existence to Bruce Wayne and leaves him in his custody in an effort to disrupt his work.

Precocious, spoiled, and violent, Damian battles Tim Drake, whom he wants to replace as Robin, and sucker punches Tim off the stuffed Tyrannosaurus in the Batcave when Tim stops fighting to help him. Damian then escapes, dons a variant Robin costume made of Jason Todd's old tunic and mask and assorted League of Assassin gear, and fights and kills the villainous Spook. Although misguided, Damian seems to genuinely want to aid Bruce's war on crime as he is Bruce's son and wants his approval. Unfortunately, because of how he was raised, Damian lacks any sort of common sense in regards to social behavior and believes that to be accepted by his father, he must kill any rivals, which included Tim Drake. This troubles his relationship with Batman, who vows never to kill. However, because of his possible paternity to Damian, Batman, on some levels, is optimistic about the chance of fatherhood.

Eventually, Batman confronts Talia to confirm Damian's true identity, but both Talia and Damian are soon caught in an explosion. They survive the explosion. However, Damian's badly injured body requires transplants of harvested organs, which his mother orders her physicians to carry out. Damian makes a full recovery.

The Resurrection of Ra's al Ghul

Beginning in Batman Annual #26 ("Head of the Demon"), Talia takes Damian to the Australian Outback, where he is tutored in the secret history of his grandfather Ra's al Ghul. Talia is unaware that White Ghost, a former servant of Ra's, plans to use him to resurrect Ra's, which would kill him in the process. Talia is able to save her son from his fate at the last minute.

Ra's is still able to return, but as a rotting, undead corpse, still needing Damian to stabilize his form. Damian flees to alert Batman but is pursued by his evil grandfather. Upon entering Wayne Manor, Damian attempts to relay to Tim Drake the fact that Ra's has returned. Tim, suspicious of Damian's intentions, does not believe his story and begins a fistfight. Damian flees and encounters Alfred. Before he can effectively relay his news, he is attacked by Tim, who perceives Damian's attempt to help a tripping Alfred as an attack, and renews their battle. As they fight, members of the League of Assassins approach the manor with the intention of killing everyone within and bringing Damian back to Ra's alive. Damian and Tim fight side by side against Ra's and his minions. Their collaboration is hindered by their very different philosophies of battle. Damian is willing to betray Tim at any moment for his own safety. Ra's captures the two and tells Batman that he will use one of them for his own body. Batman offers his own body instead.

Ra's refuses the offer, feeling that he needs someone of a younger age. The choices are Tim or Damian. Batman offers a third alternative: the "Fountain of Essence" which contains the qualities of a Lazarus Pit. Batman and Ra's go in search of the fountain, leaving Tim, Damian, Nightwing, Alfred, and Talia to battle the Sensei. Damian leaves his mother and Tim to an unknown fate, while he goes off to be with his father. He ends up captured by Ra's and is nearly killed. Batman and the others manage to save him, and Talia takes her son and escapes.

A subsequent conversation between Tim and Alfred implies that Batman has carried out a DNA test on Damian. Alfred says Bruce intended to tell him the results when the time was right. At this, Tim realizes that Damian is indeed Bruce's son, and exclaims "The son of Satan is my brother?"

Batman R.I.P.

Prior to the start of Grant Morrison's "Batman R.I.P." story arc in Batman #675, Damian senses that someone is out to get Batman. In response to this, Talia begins formulating a plan involving Commissioner James Gordon, whom Talia and Damian rescue from a booby-trapped Wayne Manor while in search of Batman, who is insane and has gone missing.

Damian and Alfred race to aid Batman against the Black Glove in a commandeered Batmobile. Damian, who is driving, knocks an ambulance off a bridge without any sign of remorse or even concern. When Alfred reprimands him, Damian retorts with a backhanded threat. The only occupant of the ambulance was the Joker.

Battle for the Cowl

In Nightwing #153 (2009), Damian is shown being left in Alfred's care and trained by Dick Grayson (alias Nightwing).

Upon the start of Batman: Battle for the Cowl, it appears that Damian is now residing in Gotham, and living under the command of Nightwing (to an extent). Where before Damian portrayed an arrogant and vicious personality, it appears the "death" of his father has regressed him to a more childlike mindset, as demonstrated when he takes the Batmobile joy-riding with an older girl. This is discovered by Oracle, who ejects the girl and takes control of the Batmobile, intent on taking Damian home. The car is blindsided by Killer Croc and Poison Ivy, who prepares to kill Damian. The older girl (Damian's companion) is later eaten by Killer Croc. Damian is saved by Nightwing who ends up being cornered by Black Mask's men until a murderous figure appears stating that he is Batman (later revealed to be Jason Todd). Although shot by Todd, Damian recovers and saves Tim Drake from falling to death inside Jason's Batcave. When Grayson hangs up his Nightwing mantle to become the newest Batman, he chooses Damian to assume the mantle of Robin by his side.

Batman: Reborn

Despite becoming Robin to Grayson's Batman, Damian reveals that he cares little for his older brother and has no respect for him as Batman and that the latter would have to earn it. In an act of defiance, Damian decides to make the Robin mantle independent from that of Batman and decides to stop Dr. Phosphorus from breaking into Project Cadmus, but fails miserably and is saved by Dick. Dick then begins to train Damian as to how to properly become the new Robin and the two develop their own unique crime-fighting style. Damian then begins to mock Tim Drake for not being chosen as Robin, causing Tim to severely beat Damian, only to be stopped by Dick.

After Tim leaves, Damian starts engaging in chess games with Hush, visiting him secretly against Dick's orders. When Elliot asked why Damian is visiting him behind the Bat-family's back, Damian shrugs it off as a desire to keep Elliot company. Elliot surmises that Damian is rather using the resemblance to Bruce to "spend time with [his] old man". Dick and Damian then encounter a villain called Professor Pyg, who has created an army called Dollotrons. Dick and Damian take the entire army down and begin to form a brotherly relationship. Damian blames himself for being unable to save a single Dollotron, a girl named Sasha, but unbeknownst to him, the girl is taken in by Jason Todd, who had shot Damian, thereby becoming the new Robin's opposite number in Red Hood's no-holds-barred war against crime (Red Hood's maxim is "let the punishment fit the crime").

Damian and Dick then attack Firefly, who is attempting to kill Black Mask. Victor Zsasz defeats Robin and rescues Black Mask while Dick takes down Firefly. These events cause Hush to escape, causing Damian to grow a further hatred for the criminal. Damian is present when Dick is inducted into the JLA, upon hearing, Damian demands to be inducted along with Dick, but his demands are promptly ignored. Damian is once again saved by Dick, with the assistance of Azrael, after a man named Amon tries to sacrifice him. Sasha, now dubbed Scarlet by Todd, returns and attacks Robin, as Jason attacks Dick, the two duos battle it out until the arrival of the Flamingo, who temporarily paralyzes Damian. Talia fixes Damian's spine but puts in a monitor connected to his brain allowing her to control his every movement.

As Dick and Damian go through various events together, such as against the Black Mask, the Blackest Night, and a rogue Batman clone-corpse, the two bond, even more, prompting Talia to give over control of the monitor to Deathstroke who tries to use it to kill Dick. Working together, Dick and Damian manage to stop Deathstroke. As Dick cares little for the financial problems of Wayne Enterprises, despite inheriting it from Bruce along with Tim, Damian decides to involve himself and manages to impress the board of directors. While he does not file a lawsuit against Dick, due to Grayson not being named the heir of Wayne Enterprises, but rather a high-ranking member, he does against Tim, who was named the heir to Wayne Enterprises.

Red Robin
Damian's second year as Robin begins when he initiates a fight against his predecessor Red Robin. Tim, who has been keeping a hit list of criminals and tasks, attracts Damian's fury when the latter hacks the hit list and discovers a hidden layer of allies to the bat family considered potential threats by Tim, including Damian. During a stakeout mission, Damian severs Tim's line, causing him to fall from a great height. He survives, and Tim pulls Damian into an all-out brawl that begins with their quarry escaping and ends in front of the theater where Bruce Wayne's parents were killed. The two are stopped by Dick Grayson as Batman, who chastises them both for fighting in front of the theater where Batman was born. The two then enter into a grudging truce for the remainder of Damian's appearances in the series. Dick suggests changing the hit list password to Cousin Oliver, as Damian has little to no interest in pop culture references and would never guess it. Dick notes that his name is not on the list and Tim asserts it is because Dick is the only one who Tim trusts implicitly.

Blackest Night

After Bruce's skull was taken from his grave, Damian and Dick decide to bring the rest of his skeleton, along with those of Damian's paternal grandparents, to their base beneath Wayne Tower. Damian is quite shaken by the sight of the bones of his family. On the way to the cave, Dick's body is possessed by Deadman, at whom Damian lashes out in confusion. Deadman then possesses and leaves Damian's body, subsequently passing his knowledge of the attack of the Black Lanterns onto him. The two heroes then prepare for the Black Lanterns' assault on Gotham. After raiding the Army Reserve National Guard Armory, Dick, Damian, and the arriving Tim Drake, are able to save Commissioner Gordon, Oracle, and the surviving police officers at Gotham Central from the reanimated versions of the original Dark Knight's deceased rogues gallery members. However, they then find themselves in a horrific encounter with the parents of Dick Grayson and Tim Drake reanimated as Black Lanterns. Dick and Tim send Damian with the Gordons to their underground base while they battle the Black Lanterns. Dick eventually orders Damian through their comm-links to send one of his Wingers with Mr. Freeze's gun. Grayson uses the weapon to cryogenically suspend himself and Tim, forcing the Black Lanterns to retreat as they are unable to read any sign of life of them. Deadman later revives the former Boy Wonders.

The Return of Bruce Wayne
Talia begins to clone Damian as she realizes that her son has completely sided with Dick Grayson and the Bat-Family. Damian finally stands up for his Robin mantle, telling Talia that being Robin was the best thing that he had ever done, and Talia does not need to save him from something he chooses to be. Talia then shows Damian a cloned version of himself, whom she sees as Damian's younger brother. Talia admits to Damian, that even though she loves him, she is too much of a perfectionist to admire him for choosing a path that defies her this blatantly, and he is therefore no longer welcome and will be considered an enemy of the House of al Ghul. Damian defiantly replies that he hopes to be a worthy one. Damian (as Robin) is then seen teaming up with Dick and Alfred to begin their own search for Bruce Wayne.

During a confrontation with a returned minor villain the Getaway Genius, Damian is initially angry that Grayson failed to capture the foe – as well as the implication that his father failed as well during the Genius' original run back when Grayson was Robin – but when Dick explains to him that Bruce let the Genius go because he discovered that the Genius' robberies were only him stealing medicines that he needed so that he could live long enough to see his daughter grow up, Damian realizes that he never really knew his father as a person, and admits that there was more to him than Batman.

After Grayson's confidant, Oberon Sexton is revealed to be the Joker in disguise, Damian tortures the villain by savagely beating him with a crowbar to get information, considering it to be self-defense since the Joker planned to attack him. However, the Clown Prince of Crime's apparent helplessness is revealed to be another ruse and he incapacitates Damian with his hidden Joker venom. The villain intends to use Damian and Dick in his fight against their common enemies: the Black Glove. Help arrives in the form of the original Batman. After Bruce Wayne helps Dick and Damian defeat the Black Glove and the Joker, Wayne accepts his son in addition to his role as Robin. Despite Bruce's parental responsibilities to Damian, he decides that he prefers Damian to continue working with Dick (who maintains the Batman mantle and whom Bruce sees as a positive role model for his son) rather than being with himself primarily, due to his plans with Batman Inc.

Teen Titans
Damian joins the Teen Titans when Dick Grayson concludes that the team needs a Robin, while also feeling that Damian would benefit from the friendship of other heroes, having progressed to the point where he can be trusted not to kill if left 'unsupervised'. Although Wonder Girl objects to this decision, Grayson convinces her to let Damian stay on the team as he needs Damian to learn that he can trust others not to betray him, only for his temper to jeopardize his first mission with the team when he attacks an opponent just after Raven had convinced him to calm down, provoking their new foe into starting his wave of destruction again. Robin eventually begins to develop a friendship with Ravager, who initially reaches out to Damian due to their similar upbringings (Ravager's father being the notorious assassin, Deathstroke). Tim Drake eventually comes to the Titans for help after a robotic duplicate of the Calculator attempts to murder his close friend, Tam Fox, and decides to rejoin the team once the mission is completed. Damian chooses to leave the team upon Drake's return, reasoning that the Teen Titans do not need two Robins, and realizing that his teammates prefer to work with Tim. Upon returning to Gotham, Damian tells Dick that even though he had been brought to the Titans to find friends, he did not need to, as he already had one, Grayson himself.

When Blackbat, Stephanie Brown's predecessor, returns to Gotham, she and Damian are partnered together during a stake-out to catch the Architect, a new villain obsessed with destroying Gotham landmarks. Damian berates Black bat and mocks her for being sent to Hong Kong by his father, but she ultimately saves his life by rescuing him from the exploding Iceberg Lounge. Afterwards, the two work together to stop the bomber from destroying a massive bridge, saving dozens of lives in the process.

Robin and a group of other ex-Titans later head to Titans Tower to help the team during a battle against Superboy-Prime and the Legion of Doom. During the battle, Robin destroys one of Prime's evil Superboy doppelgängers by using a Kryptonite blade.

The New 52

Following the "Flashpoint" story arc, Bruce Wayne was returned by writers as being the only Batman in 2011's the New 52 relaunch of DC Comics. Dick Grayson was returned to his previous role as Nightwing, and Damian still serves as his father's vigilante partner Robin. After reading the letter written by his father from an alternate timeline, the Dark Knight decides that it is time to take steps to put his past behind him. He tries to teach Damian the same values his parents have instilled within him as he finally assumes his role as a father. However, despite Bruce's attempts to build a relationship with his son, Damian remains distant from his father, which Alfred worries about. Although this relationship is further strained when Damian seemingly leaves Wayne Manor to join the villain Nobody, it turns out this was a ruse by Damian to bring down Nobody. Although Damian eventually kills Nobody in front of Bruce, they are able to work through the incident by beginning to actively understand and respect one another as father and son. Bruce goes so far as to conceal the event from Dick and Tim, leading Alfred to comment to Bruce that he has become "quite the overprotective parent".

In Batman-related issues of the New 52 taking place after Batman issue #14 (the Joker's return to comics), Damian was portrayed as being very interested in fighting his father's arch-foe. He seemed to always be eager to take on the Joker and repeatedly assumes that bad things happening in Gotham are related to the Joker in some way, in hopeful anticipation of an encounter with him. In Batman and Robin vol. 2, #15, Damian defies his father's orders to remain in the Batcave and investigates Alfred's kidnapping. The investigation leads to Gotham Zoo where Damian is captured by Joker. Joker accuses Damian and the other members of Batman's family of being a burden that prevents Batman from being the best foe for Joker. Joker tells Damian that his and Batman's greatest fear is being responsible for the other's death. Joker then presents Damian with Batman in Joker makeup, and states that Damian must kill Batman before Batman kills him. Unwilling to kill his father, Damian chooses death, but the Joker kills Batman before he can deal a fatal blow. Damian passes out from Joker venom and Batman is revealed to be a fake; as Damian recovers from the toxin, the Joker presents him with a cloche. The Joker is eventually defeated by Batman, but the trust between Batman and the Batman Family is shattered.

During the "Leviathan" story arc, when his mother Talia puts a price on his head and is targeted by the most dangerous and skilled assassins, Bruce faked Damian's death and secluded him in the Batcave to protect him while he goes undercover to confront Talia and her minions. But against his father's wishes, he escapes, donning a new costume under the name of Redbird.

Along with the mysterious Wingman and most of the Bat-family, Damian manages to rescue his father and defeat most of the League of Shadows. However, Batman explains that the temporary defeat of the League will not stop a larger force to attack later and destroy the city, so he came to the extreme decision that the only solution possible is for Damian to return to his mother, a decision that caused an emotional reaction on Damian like never before.

Death
Damian is killed battling a brutal enemy, the Heretic (an adult Damian clone) in issue number 8 of the second volume of the Batman, Inc. comic book, which went on sale February 27, 2013. According to the story's writer, Grant Morrison: "He saves the world. He does his job as Robin. He dies an absolute hero".

In the comic, Damian is fighting hordes of Leviathan henchmen in the lobby of Wayne Tower when Nightwing comes to rescue him. Behind cover, the two briefly reminisce about their time together as Batman and Robin before resuming the defense. When the Heretic arrives and knocks Nightwing out, Damian bravely fights him. However, the Heretic eventually gains the upper hand and impales Damian through the chest, the sword piercing Damian's heart and resulting in Damian dying almost instantly. Minutes after Damian's death, Batman arrives and sees Damian's dead body. Angered, he and a revived Nightwing battle the Heretic, but are eventually forced to retreat with Red Robin and Damian's body. After holding a private funeral for the fallen Boy Wonder, Bruce vows to avenge his son's death.

The later storyline, Requiem, deals with the aftermath of Damian's death and Batman's thirst for revenge against Talia as well as his own increasingly unbalanced mental state resulting from this loss. He is buried next to Bruce Wayne's parents, Damian's paternal grandparents. Batman is also unwilling to accept his son's death, and begins seeking the means to resurrect Damian at the cost of his relationships with his friends and allies, and keeps his death a secret from the public in anticipation that his resurrection would succeed. Damian's absence has also been causing a conflict between his father and his acting instructor, Carrie Kelley, who is determined to find out what has happened to him, leading her to realize that the Waynes are harboring a secret.

When Batman and Nightwing finally re-confront Heretic, they overpower him, and the clone suffers a brutal beating from both in retaliation for Damian's death. Batman, despite desiring to kill his son's murderer more than anything and Nightwing making no attempts of stopping his mentor, spares the villain's life after seeing his resemblance to Damian, realizing the clone is what is left of his son. However, Talia later kills the Heretic for his failure to kill Batman and challenges Batman to a duel to the death in the Batcave. But Talia is killed following the duel by Kathy Webb, and it is later revealed that Damian's body was stolen from the Manor cemetery by the League of Assassins along with Talia's for plans against Batman in addition to making their resurrections. It has also been shown that Ra's al Ghul has begun to engineer more clones of Damian.

Road to Resurrection
After being preoccupied with a series of cases in Gotham, Batman begins his attempt to reclaim Damian's body despite Ra's claim that he wishes to resurrect his daughter and grandson. Batman continues his pursuit out of his distrust towards Ra's. After defeating Damian's half-aquatic clones with Aquaman, Batman seeks Wonder Woman's help in chasing Ra's to Themyscira. Though Ra's attempts to resurrect Damian alongside Talia in what he thought was a Lazarus Pit in the island, in addition, to brainwash his grandson into joining him afterward, instead Ra's discovers that it is a portal to a Netherworld in the Pit's former location, of which both Wonder Woman and Batman were already aware. Ra's flees with the bodies afterward.

After Batman and Frankenstein locate Ra's and the bodies, they are too late as Ra's has successfully had them placed in a Lazarus Pit, leaving Batman in dread of Damian's fate. The resurrections fail, leaving Ra's to realize his arrogance for allowing the Heretic to kill his grandson and regret allowing Talia to clone Damian. After defeating Ra's in combat, Batman reclaims Damian's body and threatens his son's maternal grandfather that if he steals his son's body again, he will kill him in retaliation. They later encounter Darkseid's elite member Glorious Godfrey, setting in motion the Robin Rises story arc.

Return
Later, Godfrey's reason for coming to Earth is revealed; to retrieve the Chaos Shard, a powerful crystal that once belonged to Darkseid which Ra's revealed was hidden inside the sarcophagus he crafted for Damian. After detecting a trace signature of the shard coming from inside Damian's body, Godfrey escapes with Damian's corpse back to Apokolips, despite assistance from the Justice League. Angered, Batman once again vows to retrieve his son's corpse.

Batman enters and accesses the Justice League Watchtower to use his unstable exosuit known as the Hellbat armor designed by Batman himself and the Justice League members to engage large scale threats. He then activates the Boom Tube to Darkseid's homeworld, Apokolips, to retrieve Damian's corpse. Batman successfully retrieve his son's corpse as he and his family team return to Earth via the Boom Tube directly to the Batcave after successfully escaping the clutches of Darkseid and his Parademons. After this, Batman uses the Chaos Shard on his son's corpse, which has been infused with Darkseid's Omega Sanction. With Batman facing two choices of whether to resurrect Damian or his parents, he chooses his son, granting Damian's true resurrection. As Damian and Batman embrace, Batman collapses from exhaustion.

However, before the team can celebrate, the Boom Tube used to return to Earth was not closed and Darkseid's son Kalibak arrives and attacks the team. During the fight, Kalibak beats the team nearly to death, when suddenly Damian knocks out Kalibak with a powerful uppercut; discovering that due to the Chaos Shard he has gained superhuman abilities. While Damian fights Kalibak, Batman remotely controls the Batwing and sends it crashing into Kalibak, sending him back through the Boom Tube and then closes the portal. Damian then reunites with his father and his family team. In the aftermath, Damian is tested by Batman on how to control his new power abilities before Damian returns to the role as Robin. With help from the Justice League, Batman discovers that Damian's new powers do not last, and he eventually relies on his natural abilities once more.

Robin: Son of Batman
After the events of Batman: Endgame that resulted in Bruce Wayne's disappearance, Damian, as Robin, sets out on a globe-spanning journey to forge his own destiny and make amends for all of his wrongdoings in his own series, titled Robin: Son of Batman. Along his journey, he crosses paths with Ra's and Talia al Ghul, Deathstroke, and a new character named Maya Ducard, daughter of the late villain, Nobody. Damian plays a particular role in Batman and Robin Eternal when the Bat-Family is pitted against Mother, a ruthless woman who believes that she can make her 'children' stronger by putting them through intense trauma. Returning to assist his fellow Robins as the crisis reaches its conclusion, Damian helps Dick, Jason and Tim regain confidence in themselves after Mother decimates their initial efforts against her by recalling a conversation he had with Bruce where Bruce noted that he is proud of how all three of the other Robins have different strengths, Bruce wanting his partners to find their own paths rather than blindly follow his own example.

Damian is also a major player in the Robin War event, where he, Agent 37 (Dick Grayson), Red Hood, and Red Robin organize a street gang called "Robins" to defeat the Court of Owls with reluctant aid from Jim Gordon, who is now Batman. In the climax, the Court manipulates Damian into joining them so they can use him to recruit Agent 37. Dick does join to save Damian and end the war. In the aftermath, Robin forms an unlikely partnership with his mother Talia.

DC Rebirth

As part of the DC Rebirth, Damian is featured in three titles: Teen Titans, where he becomes the team's leader to defeat Ra's al Ghul and succeed Red Robin (Tim Drake) as leader, Super Sons, co-starring with Jonathan Kent, the son of Superman and the new Superboy and Nightwing, where he has a supporting role.

Teen Titans Rebirth
On his 13th birthday Damian is sent a package by his grandfather Ra's al Ghul, which contains a dead robin. After a meeting with his mother Talia, he discovers that it is a warning from his cousin Mara al Ghul, who has chosen him as her prey as part of an initiation ritual that she must undertake to properly join the League of Assassins. Mara has been made leader of a group known as the Demon's Fist, which was originally supposed to be led by Damian, but became hers when he chose to leave the League. They, too, have chosen targets that they must hunt down to ascend to the League. Damian decides to collect the other Demon's Fist's targets to form the new Teen Titans; this includes Starfire, Beast Boy, Raven and Kid Flash.

After the events of Justice League: No Justice, the Titans disband. In his subsequent struggle with organized crime in Gotham and a mysterious crime lord known as The Other, Damian assembles a new team of Titans, consisting of Kid Flash (the only old team member to join), Kid Flash's friend and kid genius Roundhouse, Red Arrow, Lobo's daughter Crush, and the immortal spirit creature Djinn. This new team faces initial difficulties because of Red Arrow's criticism and the individualistic tendencies of several members. During a case in which Gizmo nearly detonates a nuclear device, Robin uses the ring to which Djinn is bound to grant her the use of her full powers to avert the crisis, and returns it afterwards, refusing to assume mastery over her. This earns him Djinn's trust, which gradually begins to turn into a mutual romantic attraction. However, what Damian does not tell his teammates is that a deep cellar of the Titans' headquarters, a former juvenile detention facility, serves him as a secret dungeon to lock away the most dangerous criminals he captures for good, including Deathstroke, Gizmo, Brother Blood, Black Mask, and Atomic Skull.

His teammates are also unaware that he is working with Jason Todd, who goes by the alias Outlaw. Due to a miscommunication, Damian can no longer trust him, which ultimately leads them to cut ties.

Eventually, Kid Flash discovers the secret prison, and Crush, who has fallen for Djinn, kisses her, showing her the kind of genuine affection which Damian in his grimness never really did. When the other Titans find out, and when Red Arrow kills Deathstroke, conflict erupts within the team until Lobo, looking for Crush, crashes in. Djinn defeats him by altering his memory, and proceeds to do so with the other criminals Damian captures, giving them new, harmless identities.

Super Sons
In this book, Robin teams up with Superman's ten-year-old son Jonathan Kent, who he befriended previously during a test facilitated by Batman and Superman. Together, they form the Super Sons. In the first volume, Damian and Jon team against Kid Amazo, a child affected by a virus which grants powers to ordinary humans. They defeat him and Damian decides to train Jon, but Jon's desire to join the Teen Titans against Damian's wishes creates ongoing conflict between the boys. Batman and Superman construct an underwater base for the Super Sons, which Jon refers to as the "Fortress of Attitude," much to Damian's chagrin. The team returned in The Adventures of the Super-Sons, where they spend their summer pursuing justice against Rex Luthor, an alien child who imitates Lex Luthor and attempts to assemble his own team of child-villains modeled after famous Earth ones. Changes made to Jon's character make the future of this team uncertain. Despite the book's cancellation, the characters have subsequently appeared as a team in other series.

No More Teen Titans
After the death of Alfred Pennyworth and Dick Grayson losing his memories thanks to the villain KGBeast, Damian began to see his father's view of justice versus fear as not enough. Instead, Damian decides to begin killing criminals to invoke true fear in his enemies. This decision, coupled with his recent actions with holding criminals against their will and wiping their memories, leads to Djinn leaving the Teen Titans, while Kid Flash, Red Arrow, Crush, and Roundhouse turn against him. Damian attempts to kill KGBeast, but only succeeds in cutting off his left arm before the Titans intervene and stop him.

Batman then arrives, having learned of his son's actions, declaring that the Teen Titans are finished. At that moment, a revived Deathstroke attacks the Titans and Batman with the intent to kill them all. Damian pursues Deathstroke and attempts to kill him, but the Titans again intervene. Red Arrow is injured and Deathstroke escapes. Batman tries to convince Robin to come home with him, but Damian attacks him, declaring that Wayne Manor is a coffin and that Batman's views are not enough to save Gotham. At the height of his anger and frustration, Damian rips the Robin insignia off his chest and gives it to Batman. Declaring himself free, Damian leaves for parts unknown.

Robin (2021)
After Damian left the Teen Titans, they, along with members of the Bat family and Superboy, tried to find him, but Damian was able to evade their efforts. While helping the Teen Titans battle the super criminals Mammoth and Shimmer, Superboy discovers a note from Damian to him. It is not directly revealed what was in the note, but it makes Superboy realize that wherever Damian is, they won't find him. Damian also leaves a note for the Teen Titans, which contains a set of coordinates leading them into a meeting with Nightwing. Nightwing explains that Damian encouraged him to have the remaining members of the Titans and Teen Titans work together in spite of the Justice League's disapproval. This leads to a new version of the Titans forming, consisting of Nightwing, Cyborg, Raven, Starfire, Beast Boy, Troia, Crush, Roundhouse, Red Arrow, and Kid Flash.

After having his own dedicated story arc in 2021, entitled "Demon or Detective", Damian starred in the ongoing "Robin" series written by Joshua Williamson and centered around Damian going on a solo journey to discover the mysterious League of Lazarus through competing in the Lazarus tournament with Ravager, Connor Hawke and Flatline, an apprentice of one of his father's enemies who he develps a romantic relationship with. During the tournament, he discovers that the host of the tournament is his paternal great grandmother, Ruh al Ghul, who was imprisoned on this island by her son, Ra's al Ghul. At the conclusion of the first arc, both Damian's mother and grandfather arrive to aid him in defeating Ruh and in the aftermath of this arc, he returns to live with them in their palace up until the events of "Shadow War."

Shadow War

After observing how happy both his daughter and grandson are while living a peaceful life without killing, the now reformed Ra's al Ghul decides that he wants to turn himself in to the authority to atone for all the crimes he committed as well as publicly share all the secrets he kept hidden over the centuries, this decision has sparked a huge interest in both the superhero community and the villain community due the amount of knowledge the immortal Demon's Head has about the world, so all eyes were on him during a press conference he held before his incarceration. However, as soon as the conference started, Ra's was immediately shot by a sniper wearing a Deathstroke-looking costume, who also threw a bomb that turned his body to ashes to insure that there would be nothing left of him that can be resurrected through the Lazarus Pit.

This incident has deeply hurt both Damian and his mother, Talia, who had to watch her father get murdered even though he finally made the right choice for the first time in his life and was willing to turn a new leaf for his family's sake. In her grief, she gathered all the members of the League of Assassins and put a hit on Deathstroke as well as all of his associates in revenge for killing her father. On the other hand, Damian has teamed-up with his father, who wasn't fully convinced that it was the real Deathstroke that killed Ra's al Ghul, to investigate the murder and find out who was really behind it.

This event concludes with Shadow War between The League of Assassins and Deathstroke Inc, which ends with Talia killing Slade in a one-on-one battle, but shortly afterward the Deathstroke imposter reveals himself to be Geo-Force, who plotted this whole war in hope of having both Slade and Talia killing each other. Damian and Bruce arrive shortly soon and help Talia defeat Geo-Force, with Damian managing to convince his mother to not kill Geo-Force afterward because his grandfather believed that their family could be better than this.

Skills and abilities
Having been trained by the League of Assassins since birth, Damian is already an expert in martial arts and wielding a wide range of weaponry. He also has been trained in numerous weapons as shown in the Blackest Night event. Despite his age, Damian has taken on and bested trained fighters like Talia Al Ghul, Red Hood (Jason Todd), Red Robin (Tim Drake), and the Joker, amongst others. Due to the extreme training from his mother and grandfather has, Damian has the skills and stealth of that of an extremely trained assassin. He was also trained in the disciplines of forensics, acrobatics, criminology, disguise and escapology. Damian is skilled in mimicking voices and speech patterns of others accurately, as he was able to imitate his father's and Tim Drake's voices to bypass the Batcave's voice-recognition security systems.

Damian is shown to have highly advanced engineering skills, as he was able to complete his father's plans of building a flying Bat-mobile, the construction of which Alfred described as "being an endless source of frustration to Damian's father". Damian is also a capable businessman despite his young age, being involved with Wayne Enterprises and its board members.

Damian possessed superpowers similar to that of Superman following his resurrection, though this was short-lived. However in the current Batman Vs Robin comic, he is shown to have magic abilities.

Appearance

Concerning the character's artificial gestation in respect to the al Ghuls' notable idealization of Bruce Wayne as the optimal specimen in leading the League of Assassins, Damian Wayne is warranted to be notably depicted in bearing a stark resemblance to his father.

After stealing Jason Todd's Robin tunic and mask from his memorial case, Damian's unofficial appearance as Robin was wearing them over his black and white League of Assassins bodysuit with a grayish hood and cape. He carried a pair of brass knuckles, which he incorporated as part of this costume, and would also carry a sword.

After Dick Grayson officially sanctioned Damian's role as Robin, while a standard Robin tunic was retained, the bodysuit was replaced with a black survival suit, the grayish cape with a yellow "para-cape" which grants him a gliding capability, the black mask with a green one, a bulkier utility belt to carry more weapons and gadgetry, a black hood, and green gloves and flexible boots.

In DC Rebirth, Damian's suit is modified. The gauntlets and boots are more armored and he has knee pads now. His cape is now black on the outside with the cape and hood having a yellow trim. His tunic is longer and has a yellow trim as well.

After running away from Batman, Damian gets a brand new Robin suit in his solo series. It differs greatly from most Robin suits. It’s entirely black and gray with a red trim around the knees, chest, and collar. The Robin logo is red with a black “R”. He retains his old black and yellow cape and green domino mask.

As of age 13, Damian was short for his age and had few other markers of impending puberty. In Super Sons, it was a running joke that he was frequently mistaken as younger than ten-year-old Jon Kent.

Other versions

References in current continuity have been made to the future of Bruce and Talia's son.

 In DC One Million (1999), written by Grant Morrison, a Batman from the 853rd Century references a Dark Knight's battle with Two-Face-Two, which Batman #700 (2010) depicts with Damian Wayne.
 In Teen Titans vol. 3 #18 (2006), when the Teen Titans were transported 10 years into the future, a graveyard full of deceased Batman allies and villains is depicted. One tombstone reads "Ibn al Xu'ffasch" which means "son of the bat" in the Arabic language.
 Batman #666 (2007) features an adult incarnation of Damian Wayne as Batman.
 Superman/Batman #75 shows Damian Wayne as he appears in Batman #666 and #700 with Conner Kent, who is now Superman.
 Justice League: Generation Lost #14 shows another alternate future for Damian Wayne, this time taking place over 100 years in the future.
 On Earth-16 of the DC Multiverse, Damian Wayne is now Batman while Chris Kent has assumed the mantle of Superman. He is in a relationship with Lena Luthor, the daughter of Lex Luthor, who ends up betraying him.
 Damian Wayne is also featured in the prequel comic to the game Injustice: Gods Among Us.
 In the DC Rebirth Batman Beyond series, Damian has succeeded his grandfather as the new Ra's Al Ghul. However, after an antagonistic encounter with his estranged father and the new Batman, Terry McGinnis he reforms and partly reconciles with Bruce.
 A Bizarro counterpart of Robin, named Robzarro, first appeared in the four-part story "Boyzarro Re-Death". Robzarro was a member of the Bizarro Boyz, along with Boyzarro. The team name and character names were influenced by fans on social media.
 A version of Damian Wayne is present in Dark Nights: Metal.
 In Injustice vs. Masters of the Universe, which is a continuation of Superman's ending in Injustice 2, an alternate, adult version of Damian takes the mask and mantle of Batman. He and Cyborg have realized that they have been fighting for the wrong side the entire time and then reform seeking the help of the Masters of the Universe in stopping Superman, who has since bonded with Brainiac's ship and has captured and brainwashed Batman into being a mindless slave. Damian attempts to free his father from Superman's control but is killed by Wonder Woman for his betrayal which triggers Batman's release from Superman's programming. 
 An adult version of Damian Wayne appears in DCeased. He took up the mantle of Batman after he had been infected and killed.

In other media

Television

 Damian Wayne makes his television debut in the Batman: The Brave and the Bold episode "The Knights of Tomorrow!", voiced by Patrick Cavanaugh as Robin and Diedrich Bader as Batman. This version is a stark departure from his original counterpart: his mother is Selina Kyle, he bears no intent to kill at all, acts much more like his father, and his costume is similar to Tim Drake's second Robin costume. Initially portrayed as being reluctant to follow in his father's footsteps, Damian tells his parents that he does not want them to plot out his own life for him. After his parents are killed by Joker Jr. however, Damian takes up the Robin mantle and fights alongside Dick Grayson as Batman to bring Joker Jr. and the original Joker to justice. Following this, Damian goes on to fight the Club of Villains, Flamingo, and Professor Pyg. In his later years, Dick passes the Batman mantle to Damian, who is then shown fighting crime with his own child (voiced by Sebastian Bader) as the new Robin, who resembles Carrie Kelley from The Dark Knight Returns. This episode was based on a comic book story from the Silver Age where Batman was married to Kathy Kane and had a son named Bruce Wayne Jr.

 Damian appears in the DC Super Hero Girls episode "Kid Napped", voiced by Grey Griffin.
 Damian Wayne makes cameos in Young Justice. This version is still a toddler and therefore not yet Robin.
 Damian is the current Robin in the adult animated series Harley Quinn, voiced by Jacob Tremblay. He is portrayed as a spoiled brat who is not taken seriously by most individuals. In "Finding Mr. Right" in an effort to improve his reputation, he appears on a talk show and lies about Harley Quinn agreeing to be his arch-enemy. Offended, Harley kidnaps him and threatens to feed him to King Shark unless he confesses. Once he does, she reveals the talk show audience behind a curtain, humiliating him. However, Damian suffers a nosebleed and King Shark goes berserk after smelling it. While he is saved by his father Batman, Joker temporarily kidnaps him before Batman saves him again. The Dark Knight later comforts Robin and assures him he can wait until he is ready for his own nemesis. Robin then asks Batman when he can learn about sex. In the season two premiere "New Gotham", Damian took up the mantle of Batman after he disappeared in the chaos caused by Joker's destruction of Gotham during the season one finale despite not being old enough to do so and is sent home by Commissioner Gordon.

Film
 Damian Wayne has a major role in Son of Batman, voiced by Stuart Allan.
 Damian Wayne also appears in Batman vs. Robin as a sequel to Son of Batman, with Stuart Allan reprising his role.
 Damian Wayne appears in Batman: Bad Blood, a sequel to Son of Batman and Batman vs. Robin, with Stuart Allan reprising his role. His altered clone, the Heretic (voiced by Travis Willingham), also appears as an antagonist.
 Damian Wayne appears in Justice League vs. Teen Titans, a sequel to Justice League: War and Justice League: Throne of Atlantis, with Stuart Allan reprising his role. Although reluctant to join the Titans, he befriends them, risking his own life to help them stop Trigon. He also forms a growing romantic relationship with Raven.
 Damian Wayne appears in Lego DC Comics Super Heroes: Justice League: Gotham City Breakout, Lego DC Comics Super Heroes: Aquaman: Rage of Atlantis and Lego DC Batman: Family Matters, voiced by Scott Menville.
 Damian Wayne appears in Batman Unlimited: Mech vs. Mutants, voiced by Lucien Dodge.
 Damian Wayne appears in the film Teen Titans: The Judas Contract with Stuart Allan reprising his role. He faces challenges such as being haunted by his past when Deathstroke returns and uses Terra as his pawn to bring the Titans to Brother Blood. This movie shows his character growth as he recognizes Terra has similar problems with anger and fitting in, and even though he doesn't trust her, he still wants to help her. It's also clear his bond with Raven has grown, as she realizes the incident with Slade still deeply disturbs him, she ends up giving him a puppy that will show him the unconditional love he so desperately needs, he would later name the dog Titus.
 A Feudal Japan version of Robin appears in the anime film Batman Ninja, voiced by Yūki Kaji in Japanese and by Yuri Lowenthal in English.
 Damian Wayne makes a non-speaking appearance in The Death of Superman. He silently tries to comfort his father in Wayne Manor over Superman's apparent demise.
 Damian Wayne also appears in Batman: Hush in a cameo, voiced again by Stuart Allan.
 Damian Wayne appears in Batman vs. Teenage Mutant Ninja Turtles voiced by Ben Giroux. He follows the Foot Clan to their hideout and reveals to Batman that Ra's al Ghul and the League of Assassins are collaborating with the Shredder. Damian later helps to fight the mutated supervillains, the League of Assassins, and the Foot Clan. By the end of the movie, Batman allows Damian to join in on the pizza dinner he got for the turtles before their departure.
 Damian Wayne makes his final appearance in the DC Animated Movie Universe in the film Justice League Dark: Apokolips War voiced again by Stuart Allan. He helps the remnants of the Justice League fight against Darkseid and his Para-Dooms (hybrids of the Parademons and Doomsday). Damian and Raven finally confess their love for each other and are a couple by the end of the film.
 Damian Wayne appears in one of the alternate storylines of the interactive film Batman: Death in the Family. In one ending, Damian appears as an infant with his mother Talia meeting Jason Todd after he has taken on a new identity similar to Hush. Talia wishes for Jason to help raise his adoptive brother, an offer he accepts while secretly planning to turn Damian against both of his parents.
 Damian Wayne appears in the animated film Injustice, voiced by Zach Callison.
 Damian Wayne appears in the animated film Batman and Superman: Battle of the Super Sons, voiced by Jack Griffo.
 Damian Wayne will appear as Robin in the live-action The Brave and the Bold film.

Video games
 Damian Wayne is a playable character in Lego Batman 2: DC Super Heroes, voiced by Charlie Schlatter. He was included in the Heroes pre-order pack exclusive to Amazon.com and EB Games.
 Damian Wayne appears as a summonable character in Scribblenauts Unmasked: A DC Comics Adventure.
 Damian Wayne appears in Infinite Crisis, voiced by James Arnold Taylor. Damian Wayne is the equivalent of Robin from the "Nightmare" universe appears as one of the available "champions".
 Damian Wayne appears as a playable character in DC Unchained.
 Damian Wayne appears as a playable character in Lego DC Super-Villains, voiced again by Stuart Allan.
 Damian Wayne was supposed to make his debut in the Batman: Arkham series as the lead character in a post–Batman: Arkham Knight game by WB Montreal, but the project was cancelled.

Injustice
 Damian Wayne appears as a playable character in Injustice: Gods Among Us, voiced by Neal McDonough. In the alternate universe ruled by Superman's One Earth Regime, an adult version of Damian has assumed the mantle of Nightwing after accidentally killing Dick Grayson and joining the Regime. He first appears leading Regime forces with Hawkgirl in an attack on the Joker Clan at Arkham Asylum, during which he is defeated by the mainstream version of Joker who was accidentally brought to this universe by Batman's Insurgency. Nightwing later fights and is defeated by Batman at Stryker's Island during a break-in to rescue mainstream Batman. During their fight, Batman says Nightwing isn't his son and that Dick was his true son, while Nightwing claims that Superman is a better father than Batman ever was. At the end of the game, Nightwing is seen being arrested along with other Regime members following Superman's defeat. In his non-canon Arcade ending, after defeating Superman, Damian becomes more violent and cruel than ever before, catching Sinestro's attention, who convinces him to join the Yellow Lantern Corps to bring more fear into the hearts of criminals.
 Damian also appears as a playable character in Injustice 2 sequel, voiced by Scott Porter. He appears as both Robin and Nightwing. Prior to the events of the first game, Robin accompanies Batman to stop the Regime from rounding up Arkham Asylum inmates to execute. Following an argument and fight between Batman and Superman, Robin sides with the latter after executing Victor Zsasz as a show of trust, believing in Superman's cause to kill criminals, and he leaves with him to join the Regime. In the present, Nightwing is released from Stryker's Island alongside Superman and Cyborg by Wonder Woman, Black Adam and Supergirl, and given his gear back. He then fights and is defeated by either Firestorm or Blue Beetle, who are attempting to stop the breakout. Nightwing later reluctantly joins forces with the Insurgency to defeat Brainiac and fights Supergirl to stop her from her leaving the Fortress of Solitude after the latter discovers the Regime's true nature, though he is defeated. In Damian's Arcade ending, Batman sacrifices himself to allow Damian to kill Brainiac. Damian realizes he misjudged his father and assumes the mantle of Batman to honor his legacy.

References

Alternative versions of Batman
Batman characters
Characters created by Mike W. Barr
Characters created by Jerry Bingham
Characters created by Andy Kubert
Characters created by Grant Morrison
Characters created by Alex Ross
Characters created by Mark Waid
Comics characters introduced in 2006
DC Comics sidekicks
DC Comics characters with accelerated healing
DC Comics child superheroes
DC Comics male superheroes
DC Comics martial artists
DC Comics superheroes
Fictional Arabs
Fictional blade and dart throwers
Fictional genetically engineered characters
Fictional gymnasts
Fictional kenjutsuka
Fictional murderers
Fictional assassins in comics
Fictional escapologists
Fictional Ninjutsu practitioners
Fictional ninja
Fictional detectives
Fictional hackers
Fictional acrobats
Fictional criminologists
Fictional offspring of rape
Fictional swordfighters in comics
Robin (character)
Teenage superheroes
Vigilante characters in comics